Nezara viridula, commonly known as the southern green stink bug (USA), southern green shield bug (UK) or green vegetable bug (Australia and New Zealand), is a plant-feeding stink bug. Believed to have originated in Ethiopia, it can now be found around the world. Because of its preference for certain species of legumes, such as beans and soybeans, it is an economically important pest on such crops.

Description 
The body is usually bright green and shield-shaped and the eyes are usually reddish, but they may also be black. There is a row of three white spots on the scutellum. They differ from the similar green stink bug (Chinavia hilare) by the shape of their scent gland openings, which are short and wide in N. viridula, and narrow and long in the green stink bug.

Color morphs 
Several distinct morphs can be distinguished by the pattern of their exoskeleton coloration. The most common morph is predominantly green (Nezara viridula f. smaragdula), a less common morph is green with white or yellowish front margins on the head and the thorax (Nezara viridula f. torquata Fabricius, 1775) and a very rare morph has a uniformly orange or yellow (occasionally pink) coloration (Nezara viridula f. aurantiaca).

Life history 
Nezara viridula reproduces throughout the year in tropics. In temperate zones this species presents a reproductive winter diapause, associated with a reversible change of body colouration from green to brown or russet.

When ready to mate N.viridula sound 100 Hz vibration with a "tymbal" composed of a fused first and second terga (not to be confused with tymbal of cicadas) that allow bi-directional communication to any Nezara standing on the same plant so they could find each other. The female lays 30 to 130 eggs at a time, in the form of an egg mass glued firmly to the bottom of a leaf. The eggs are barrel-shaped, with an opening on the top. The eggs take between 5 and 21 days to develop, depending on the temperature. The newborn larvae gather near the empty eggs and do not feed until three days later, after the first moult. They moult five times before reaching maturity, increasing in size each time. Each instar stage lasts about a week, except for the last one before the metamorphosis, which is a day longer. Up to four generations can develop in one year, with eggs developing into adults in as few as 35 days in mid-summer. Up until their third moult the larvae aggregate together on the host plant, the purpose of this aggregation is probably pooling of chemical defenses against predators, for example ants.

Gallery

Ecology 
It is a highly polyphagous herbivore, able to feed on plants from over 30 families, both monocots and dicots. It has a preference for legumes, preferring to feed on plants that are fruiting or forming pods.

The most important factor limiting the population in temperate zones is winter cold. Mortality of overwintering individuals is between 30 and 80%, and the population cannot survive in areas where the average mid-winter temperature is below 5 °C. Females are more likely to survive the winter than males, as are larger individuals and those that develop reddish-brown coloration. In recent decades, the species seems to be expanding its range towards the north in the northern hemisphere, possibly because of global warming. The animal's ability to survive the winter also depends on the timely onset of diapause.

Origin and range 
Nezara viridula is a cosmopolitan species, living in tropical and subtropical regions of Americas, Africa, Asia, Australasia and Europe between 45 degrees north and 45 degrees south. Its exact origin is unknown, but it is believed to have originated from the Ethiopia region of East Africa, from where it has spread around the world thanks to its strong flight and human trade routes.

See also 
 Green stink bug (Chinavia hilare)

References

External links 
 
 Nezara viridula pheromones in Pherobase.
 Fauna Europaea
 video of Nezara viridula

Nezarini
Cosmopolitan arthropods
Agricultural pest insects
Bugs described in 1758
Insects of Ethiopia
Taxa named by Carl Linnaeus
Insect pests of millets